Gone But Not Forgotten may refer to:
Gone, But Not Forgotten (novel), a 1993 novel by Phillip Margolin
Gone, But Not Forgotten, a television movie based on the novel that was made in 2004, and broadcast on Lifetime in 2006.
Gone, But Not Forgotten (film), a 2003 film by Michael D. Akers
"Gone, But Not Forgotten (Dallas)", a 1981 episode of Dallas
"Gone But Not Forgotten", a song by Rick Wakeman from The Cost of Living
"Gone But Not Forgotten", a song by TQ from Listen
"Gone But Not Forgotten", a 2021 song by Brantley Gilbert
Gone But Not Forgotten  song by Johnny Cash, Live at The Carter Family Fold